This is a list of solar eclipses that will occur in the 22nd century. During the period 2101 to 2200 there will be 235 solar eclipses of which 79 will be partial, 87 will be annular (five non-central), 65 will be total, and 4 will be hybrids. The greatest number of eclipses in one year will be four, in 11 different years: 2112, 2134, 2141, 2152, 2159, 2170, 2177, 2181, 2188, 2195, and 2199.

Longest and shortest

Lists of eclipses

References

22nd century in science
+22